Dennis Duane "D. J." Reed Jr. (born November 11, 1996) is an American football cornerback for the New York Jets of the National Football League (NFL). He played college football at Kansas State and was drafted by the San Francisco 49ers in the fifth round of the 2018 NFL Draft.

High school
Reed attended Independence High School in Bakersfield, California. In his high school football career, he totaled six interceptions and five forced fumbles along with 1,150 total yards of offense with 13 touchdowns. Along with football, he also played basketball and was the first person in school history to be named MVP in both sports. Reed chose to play football for the Fresno State Bulldogs.

College career

Reed redshirted as a true freshman at Fresno State in 2014.

Reed chose to transfer from Fresno State to Cerritos College, a community college in Norwalk, California. At Cerritos, as a redshirt freshman, he played in 11 games and tallied 42 tackles, three pass breakups, and two interceptions.

After one year at Cerritos, Reed once again transferred, this time to Kansas State University. As a redshirt sophomore in 2016, Reed played in all 13 of Kansas State's games as both a cornerback and a return specialist. Defensively, Reed totaled 75 tackles, 16 pass deflections and two forced fumbles. Offensively, he returned nine kickoffs for 255 yards. After the season, he was named to the 2016 All-Big 12 Conference football team.

Prior to the 2017 season, Reed was named to the Chuck Bednarik Award watch list, the Jim Thorpe Award watch list and the Bronko Nagurski Award watch list. In 11 games (he missed the last two regular season games due to injury, but played in the Cactus Bowl) in 2017 he made 47 total tackles along with four interceptions, nine pass deflections and one forced fumble along with returning 17 kickoffs for 253 yards and one touchdown. After the conclusion of the season, he was named to the 2017 All-Big 12 Conference football team. Reed declared for the 2018 NFL Draft on December 31, 2017.

Professional career

San Francisco 49ers
Reed was drafted by the San Francisco 49ers in the fifth round (142nd overall) of the 2018 NFL Draft. In his second season, Reed reached Super Bowl LIV, but the 49ers lost 31-20 to the Kansas City Chiefs. He was placed on the active/non-football injury list at the start of training camp on July 28, 2020, and waived from the list with a non-football injury designation on August 4, 2020.

Seattle Seahawks
On August 5, 2020, Reed was claimed off waivers by the Seattle Seahawks. He was placed on the reserve/non-football injury list at the start of the regular season on September 5, 2020, before being activated on October 31, 2020. He stepped in at the right cornerback position following an injury to Quinton Dunbar. Reed recorded his first career interception during a 37–27 Week 8 win against the San Francisco 49ers. He recorded a second interception in a 20-15 Week 15 victory against the Washington Football Team. Due to his strong play, Reed retained his starting position for the rest of the season, even when Dunbar was healthy.

New York Jets
On March 17, 2022, Reed signed a three-year, $33 million contract with the New York Jets. On September 12, Reed intercepted a pass during a 24-9 loss to the Baltimore Ravens.

References

External links
 Kansas State bio

1996 births
Living people
American football cornerbacks
Cerritos Falcons football players
Kansas State Wildcats football players
Players of American football from Bakersfield, California
San Francisco 49ers players
Seattle Seahawks players
New York Jets players